Saint-Aulaye-Puymangou is a commune in the Dordogne department of southwestern France. The municipality was established on 1 January 2016 and consists of the former communes of Saint-Aulaye and Puymangou.

See also 
Communes of the Dordogne department

References 

Communes of Dordogne
Dordogne communes articles needing translation from French Wikipedia